The Calhoun County Courthouse is a courthouse in Hampton, Arkansas, the county seat of Calhoun County, built in 1909. Located within downtown Hampton, the two-story brick building was designed by Frank W. Gibb, who designed 60 courthouses in Arkansas. The courthouse is both a historically and architecturally significant structure, and was listed on the National Register of Historic Places because of this significance in 1976.

Architecture

Constructed by E. L. Koonce, the Calhoun County Courthouse is a two-story brick Georgian Revival structure with a five-story clock tower. The building is not particularly ornamented, with cut stone trim, including stone keystones above arched windows.

See also

List of county courthouses in Arkansas
National Register of Historic Places listings in Calhoun County, Arkansas

References

Courthouses on the National Register of Historic Places in Arkansas
Government buildings completed in 1909
County courthouses in Arkansas
Georgian Revival architecture in Arkansas
National Register of Historic Places in Calhoun County, Arkansas
1909 establishments in Arkansas
Hampton, Arkansas